The 2020 North Queensland Cowboys season was the 26th in the club's history. Coached by Paul Green and captained by Michael Morgan, they competed in the NRL's 2020 Telstra Premiership. The 2020 season was the club's first at their new home ground, Queensland Country Bank Stadium, after 25 seasons at Willows Sports Complex.

On 20 July, Green resigned as head coach after just three wins from the opening 10 games. He was replaced by assistant coach Josh Hannay, who took over as interim head coach until the end of the season.

Season summary

Milestones
 Round 1: Valentine Holmes, Esan Marsters and Reece Robson made their debuts for the club.
 Round 1: Valentine Holmes scored his first try for the club.
 Round 2: The club played the Canterbury-Bankstown Bulldogs in the first match without fans in Australian first grade history.
 Round 3: Reece Robson scored his first try in the NRL.
 Round 4: Tom Gilbert made his NRL debut.
 Round 5: Hamiso Tabuai-Fidow made his NRL debut.
 Round 6: Connelly Lemuelu made his NRL debut.
 Round 6: Esan Marsters scored his first try for the club.
 Round 10: Daejarn Asi made his NRL debut.
 Round 10: Daejarn Asi scored his first NRL try.
 Round 11: Ben Hampton played his 100th NRL game.
 Round 13: Emry Pere made his NRL debut.
 Round 13: Francis Molo played his 50th NRL game.
 Round 14: Mitchell Dunn and Connelly Lemuelu scored their first NRL tries.
 Round 15: The club were held scoreless for the first time since Round 1, 2012.
 Round 19: Ben Condon made his NRL debut.

Squad

Squad movement

Gains

Losses

Re-signings

Ladder

Fixtures

NRL Nines 

The NRL Nines is a pre-season rugby league nines competition featuring all 16 NRL clubs. The 2020 competition was played over two days on February 14 and 15 at HBF Park in Perth. The Cowboys finished first in Pool 4 and defeated the South Sydney Rabbitohs, Gold Coast Titans and St George Illawarra Dragons on their way to winning the competition.

Pool Play

Finals

Pre-season

Regular season
Due to the COVID-19 pandemic in Australia, the regular season was suspended after Round 2. On 9 April, the NRL announced that competition would re-commence on 28 May with a shortened 20-round regular season. On 21 May, the full revised draw was released From Round 7 onward, the Cowboys were allowed to host fans at their home games, starting with a limit of 2,000, before eventually rising to 10,000 from Round 9.

Statistics

Representatives
The following players have played a representative match in 2020.

Honours

Club
Paul Bowman Medal: Jason Taumalolo
Players' Player: Josh McGuire
Coach's Award: Mitchell Dunn
Member's Player of the Year: Kyle Feldt
Club Person of the Year: John Asiata
Rookie of the Year: Hamiso Tabuai-Fidow

Feeder Clubs

Queensland Cup
The Cowboys' three feeder clubs, the Mackay Cutters, Northern Pride and Townsville Blackhawks, each played just one game before the 2020 Queensland Cup season was postponed and later cancelled due to the COVID-19 pandemic.

Women's team

QRL Women's Premiership
The Cowboys' women's team, the North Queensland Gold Stars, played just one game in the QRL Women's Premiership before the season was postponed and later cancelled due to the COVID-19 pandemic.

References

North Queensland Cowboys seasons
North Queensland Cowboys season